The Swedish Federation of Young Musicians (Swedish: Riksförbundet Unga Musikanter) or RUM, is a democratic organization for young Swedish musicians and students of the Swedish music and culture schools.

RUM was established in 1973 but as a part of another organization. In 1978 (the birth year), RUM became an independent youth organization.

External links
 English information about the Swedish Federation of Young Musicians

Swedish music
Youth organizations based in Sweden